The African Mountain Running Championships was an annual Mountain running competition organized by the CAA for athletes representing the countries of its member associations.  The event was established in 2009 and ceased in 2014.

Editions

Results
Complete results were published.

See also
World Mountain Running Championships
European Mountain Running Championships
NACAC Mountain Running Championships
South American Mountain Running Championships

References

Continental athletics championships
Mountain running competitions
Recurring sporting events established in 2009
Recurring sporting events disestablished in 2014
Mountain running
Mountain Running
Defunct athletics competitions